Mortal Kombat is a 2021 martial arts fantasy film directed by Simon McQuoid in his directorial debut, from a screenplay by Greg Russo and Dave Callaham and a story by Russo and Oren Uziel. The film is based on the video game franchise of the same name and a reboot of the Mortal Kombat film series. The film stars Lewis Tan, Jessica McNamee, Josh Lawson, Tadanobu Asano, Mehcad Brooks, Ludi Lin, Chin Han, Max Huang, Joe Taslim, and Hiroyuki Sanada. The film follows Cole Young, a washed-up mixed martial arts fighter who is unaware of his hidden lineage or why the assassin Sub-Zero is hunting him down. Concerned for the safety of his family, he seeks out a clique of fighters that were chosen to defend Earthrealm against Outworld.

Following the critical and commercial failure of the 1997 film Mortal Kombat: Annihilation, a third Mortal Kombat film languished in development hell for a period of nearly two decades. In late 2010, Warner Bros. Pictures and New Line Cinema began developing a new film, with Kevin Tancharoen serving as director from a script written by Uziel in the wake of their Mortal Kombat: Rebirth short film. James Wan was announced as a producer in August 2015 and McQuoid was hired as director in November 2016. Production took place at Adelaide Studios in Adelaide and at other locations in South Australia. Principal photography occurred from September to December 2019.

Mortal Kombat was released internationally on April 8, 2021, then in the United States on April 23, simultaneously in theaters in Dolby Cinema, IMAX and 4DX and on the HBO Max streaming service. It received mixed reviews from critics, who praised the performances, production values, action sequences and greater faithfulness to the source material then the previous films, but criticised its dialogue and exposition. The film grossed $84.4 million worldwide against a $55 million budget and became HBO Max's most-successful film launch to date. A sequel is in development, with Jeremy Slater set to write the screenplay and McQuoid returning as director.

Plot
In 17th-century Japan, Lin Kuei assassins led by Bi-Han kill the warriors of the rival Shirai Ryu ninja clan led by Hanzo Hasashi, including Hanzo's wife and son. After killing the attackers, Hanzo fights Bi-Han, but Bi-Han stabs him with his own kunai. A dying Hanzo tells Bi-Han to remember his face and dies, resulting in his soul being condemned to the Netherrealm. Raiden, God of Thunder, arrives and takes Hanzo's surviving infant, whom Bi-Han did not notice, to safety.

In the year 2021, the realm of Outworld has defeated Earthrealm in nine of ten tournaments known as "Mortal Kombat"; if Earthrealm loses the tenth tournament, the rules state it will be conquered by Outworld. However, an ancient prophecy states that the "blood of Hanzo Hasashi" will unite a new generation of Earthrealm's champions to prevent Outworld's victory. Aware of this, soul-eating sorcerer Shang Tsung, who has overseen the last nine victories, sends his warriors to kill Earthrealm's champions, identified by a dragon mark, before the next tournament begins. One such champion, a former professional MMA fighter named Cole Young, is attacked alongside his family by Bi-Han, who now calls himself Sub-Zero. However, Special Forces Major Jackson "Jax" Briggs rescues the Youngs, directing them to find his partner, Sonya Blade. Jax stays to battle Sub-Zero but loses his arms in the process.

Cole tracks Sonya to her hideout, where she is interrogating a captive Australian mercenary named Kano. She reveals that she and Jax have been investigating Mortal Kombat's existence, and that the dragon mark can be transferred to anyone who kills the original bearer. They are attacked by Shang Tsung's assassin, Syzoth, but Kano kills him with Cole and Sonya's help. They travel to Raiden's temple and meet current Earthrealm champions Liu Kang and Kung Lao before being brought to Raiden, who is critical of the newcomers. They are joined by Jax, whom Raiden rescued and fitted with a set of mechanical arms. Shang Tsung attempts to attack the temple, but is stopped when Raiden shields it from intrusion. While Sonya helps Jax recover, Cole and Kano train with Kang and Kung Lao to unlock their "Arcana", a special power unique to all dragon mark bearers.

During an argument, Kano awakens his arcana, the ability to shoot a laser out of his right eye. Cole is unable to awaken his, despite his persistence. Disappointed with Cole, Raiden sends him back to his family, while revealing that he is a descendant of Hasashi. Shang Tsung gathers his warriors, including Kano's former ally, Kabal, to attack the temple. Kabal convinces Kano to defect and sabotage the shield. During the fray, Jax awakens his arcana, granting him superhuman strength and upgraded arms. Concurrently, the Youngs are attacked by Goro. Cole rouses his arcana, giving him a suit of armor that can absorb and channel energy from physical attacks and a set of tonfas. He kills Goro and helps repel the attack on the temple. Shang Tsung and Sub-Zero are infuriated when Raiden discloses Cole's bloodline before he teleports most of the Earthrealm fighters to the Void, a safe space between realms. Sub-Zero attempts to prevent Cole from being teleported, but Kung Lao saves Cole from Sub-Zero and has his soul taken by Shang Tsung.

Cole proposes a plan to force Outworld's champions into a single combat with those from the Earthrealm before neutralizing Sub-Zero together, forcing the tournament that Shang Tsung tried to prevent. Agreeing with the plan, Raiden gives Cole Hanzo's kunai, which still has Hanzo's blood on it, telling him that using it would get Hanzo's spirit to fight alongside him. Raiden transports Cole and his allies to their targets. While defeating Outworld's champions, including Kabal, whom Liu Kang defeats to avenge Kung Lao's death, Sonya kills Kano and acquires his dragon mark, while also getting the ability to fire purple energy blasts as her own arcana, which she uses to kill Mileena. Sub-Zero abducts Cole's family to lure him into a one-on-one fight. Overpowered by Sub-Zero, Cole uses the kunai and drains Hanzo's blood left on it, releasing Hanzo as the vengeful specter, Scorpion. Recognizing Cole as his descendant, Scorpion helps him defeat Sub-Zero and free his family before immolating Sub-Zero with hellfire. Thanking Cole for freeing him and requesting that he take care of the Hasashi bloodline, Scorpion departs as Raiden, the other champions, and Shang Tsung arrive.

Shang Tsung vows that, next time, he will bring armies instead of individual fighters as he sends his champions' corpses back to Outworld before Raiden banishes him. Raiden declares his intention to train new warriors in preparation for the next tournament and assigns his current champions to recruit them. Cole then departs to Los Angeles in search of Hollywood martial arts movie star Johnny Cage.

Cast

 Lewis Tan as Cole Young
 Jessica McNamee as Sonya Blade
 Josh Lawson as Kano
 Mehcad Brooks as Jackson "Jax" Briggs
 Ludi Lin as Liu Kang
 Max Huang as Kung Lao
 Tadanobu Asano as Raiden
 Chin Han as Shang Tsung
 Joe Taslim as Bi-Han / Sub-Zero
 Hiroyuki Sanada as Hanzo Hasashi / Scorpion
 Matilda Kimber as Emily Young
 Laura Brent as Allison Young
 Sisi Stringer as Mileena
 Mel Jarnson as Nitara
 Nathan Jones as Reiko
 Daniel Nelson as Kabal
 Damon Herriman as Kabal (voice)
 Angus Sampson as Goro (voice)

Production

Development

In 1997, Robin Shou's original Mortal Kombat contract was a three-picture deal, and Threshold Entertainment's production on a second sequel was initially scheduled to commence shortly after the release of Annihilation, but it was shelved due to Annihilations poor reception and disappointing box-office performance. Attempts to produce a third film since then have remained stuck in development hell with numerous script rewrites and storyline, cast, and crew changes. A November 2001 poll on the official Mortal Kombat website hosted by Threshold asked fans which characters they believed would die in the third movie. The 2005 destruction of New Orleans by Hurricane Katrina greatly affected one of the film's planned shooting locations. In June 2009, a bankruptcy court lawsuit saw Lawrence Kasanoff suing Midway Games while mentioning that a third film was in the works. Warner Bros. Pictures (which became the parent of New Line Cinema in 2008, after over a decade of both operating as separate divisions of Time Warner) ended up purchasing most of Midway's assets, including Mortal Kombat.

In 2010, director Kevin Tancharoen released an eight-minute short film titled Mortal Kombat: Rebirth, made as a pitch to Warner Bros. Pictures of a reboot of the Mortal Kombat film franchise. In September 2011, New Line Cinema and Warner Bros. announced that Tancharoen was hired to direct a new feature-length film from a screenplay by Mortal Kombat: Rebirth writer Oren Uziel, with the intention of aiming for an R rating. Shooting was expected to begin in March 2012 with a budget projected at between $40–50 million and a release date of 2013. However, the project was ultimately delayed due to budget constraints, and Tancharoen began working on the second season of the web series Mortal Kombat: Legacy until problems with the film had been sorted out, but he quit the film production in October 2013.

James Wan signed on as the film's producer in August 2015. Simon McQuoid was hired as director in November 2016, marking his feature directorial debut, with Greg Russo writing the script. McQuoid had turned down the offer initially, but ultimately signed on after reading Russo's script.  Russo tweeted in February 2019 that the film's script was complete. In May 2019, it was announced that the film had entered pre-production and would be shot in South Australia, with a release date of March 5, 2021. Russo tweeted in July 2019 that the film would indeed have an R rating and that the games' Fatalities would "finally be on the big screen".

In April 2021, McQuoid revealed that the film came "quite close to the line" of getting an NC-17 rating by the Motion Picture Association, saying in full, "What we had to be a bit careful of was... you can get to NC-17 territory pretty quick. It's different in a video game when it's not real human beings. When you move this across to reality, a different set of things start to happen in your mind, and you get rated slightly differently. So there were certain things that are in the game that would mean the film would be unreleasable. And none of us wanted that. … So we were balancing that stuff all the time. And there's some stuff that you will see that really gets quite close to the line because we didn't want people to go, 'Meh. Seemed kind of lame.'" Ultimately, after some edits, the film received its intended R rating.

Casting
Joe Taslim was the first actor cast for the production in July 2019, as Bi-Han, the first Sub-Zero. In August, Mehcad Brooks, Tadanobu Asano, Sisi Stringer, and Ludi Lin were cast in the roles of Jax Briggs, Raiden, Mileena, and Liu Kang respectively. Later that month, Josh Lawson, Jessica McNamee, Chin Han and Hiroyuki Sanada were cast as Kano, Sonya Blade, Shang Tsung and Scorpion respectively, with Lewis Tan in the role of Cole Young, a new character created for the film. On September 16, 2019, it was announced that Max Huang had been cast as Kung Lao. Stuntwoman Elissa Cadwell was announced as having been cast as Nitara on November 11, 2019. However, in the film she is actually played by Mel Jarnson. Matilda Kimber was cast as Emily on December 4, 2019.

Filming
Production took place at Adelaide Studios and other locations in South Australia, lasting from September 16 to December 13, 2019. In November 2020, Todd Garner stated that "we have more days to shoot" in a statement regarding the film's release delay. The film was shot on the ARRI ALEXA LF and Mini LF cameras with Panavision Anamorphic lenses.

Visual effects
Rising Sun Pictures (RSP), an Adelaide company, was principal VFX provider, delivering over 600 visual effects shots for the film. The studio's artists also created the effects for the last scene, a furious fight lasting around 10 minutes. RSP won an AEAF Special Merit Award in 2021 for their work on the film.

Music

The score for Mortal Kombat was composed by Benjamin Wallfisch. In March 2021, director Simon McQuoid revealed that Wallfisch actually began compositions for the film before he was officially hired on the project and that the film will include a new version of the track "Techno Syndrome" by The Immortals, produced by Wallfisch.

Release

Marketing
On January 15, 2021, which was when the film was initially set to release prior to being delayed due the COVID-19 pandemic, Entertainment Weekly released a first look of the film, which contained several behind the scenes photos. On February 17, 2021, a series of character posters were released for the film, along with the next announcement that the film's first trailer would be released the following day. On February 18, 2021, the first red band trailer for the film was released online. The film's first trailer had become the most-watched red-band trailer until the release of the first trailer of The Suicide Squad a month later.

Theatrical and streaming
Mortal Kombat was theatrically released internationally, beginning on April 8, 2021, and was later released in the United States on April 23, 2021, in both theaters in Dolby Cinema, IMAX and 4DX and on HBO Max. The film was originally going to be released on March 5, 2021, before being moved up to January 15, 2021. In November 2020, producer Todd Garner confirmed that the film would be delayed until theaters are reopened due to the COVID-19 pandemic, before it was finally dated for release on April 16 in 3D. As part of its plans for all of its 2021 films, Warner Bros. also streamed the film simultaneously on the HBO Max service for one month, after which the film was removed until the normal home media release schedule period. In Australia and New Zealand, the film was released onto Netflix in January 2022 despite its HBO Max release elsewhere due to the service's HBO Max lack of availability outside of North America.

In late March 2021, the film was delayed one week to April 23. The film was released in Japan on June 18, 2021, despite not having Mortal Kombat games released officially in the country due to CERO gaming rules concerning excessive gore.

Home media
Mortal Kombat was released on Digital HD on June 11, 2021 and on DVD, Blu-ray and Ultra HD Blu-ray by Warner Bros. Home Entertainment on July 13, 2021.

Reception

Audience viewership 
Following its U.S. release, Samba TV reported that 3.8 million households watched at least the first five minutes over its first three days. It was watched in 4.3 million households during its first week and 5.5 million households over the first 17 days, a record for an HBO Max title. By the end of its first month, the film had been streamed in over 5.6 million U.S. households. In January 2022, tech firm Akami reported that Mortal Kombat was the fifth most pirated film of 2021.

Box office
Mortal Kombat grossed $42.3 million in the United States and Canada, and $42.1 million in other territories, for a worldwide total of $84.4 million.

Release alongside Demon Slayer: Kimetsu no Yaiba the Movie: Mugen Train on April 23, 2021. Mortal Kombat was originally projected to gross $10–12 million in its domestic opening weekend, the film made $9 million from 3,073 theaters on its first day of release, increasing estimates to $19 million. It went on to debut to $23.3 million, topping the box office. In its second weekend the film dropped 73% to $6.2 million, finishing second behind Demon Slayer: Kimetsu no Yaiba the Movie: Mugen Train ($6.4 million), and $2.4 million in its third weekend.

In its opening international weekend, the film made $10.7 million from 17 countries, with the largest market being Russia ($6.1 million). In its second weekend the film made $5.7 million from 28 countries.

Critical response
The review aggregator website Rotten Tomatoes reported an approval rating of 54%, with an average score of 5.4/10, based on 294 reviews. The site's critics consensus reads, "Largely for fans of the source material but far from fatal(ity) flawed, Mortal Kombat revives the franchise in appropriately violent fashion." Metacritic assigned the film a weighted average score of 44 out of 100, based on 43 critics, indicating "mixed or average reviews". Audiences polled by CinemaScore gave the film an average grade of "B+" on an A+ to F scale, while those at PostTrak gave it a 92% positive score, with 78% saying they would definitely recommend it.

Alonso Duralde of the TheWrap wrote: "Viewers interested in martial-arts action are bound to find the combat-with-a-C to be lackluster in that way that hand-to-hand fighting tends to be when it gets drowned out by digital effects. More likely to have fun with this latest Mortal Kombat are Sam Raimi enthusiasts who can appreciate the comedy in over-the-top geysers of fake blood, which the film unleashes with increasing regularity as the fights get more serious." The Hollywood Reporters John DeFore said the film was "not exactly a knockout" and wrote: "A B-movie that would benefit immensely from some wit in the script and charisma in the cast, it's not as aggressively hacky as P.W.S.A.'s oeuvre, but it runs into problems he didn't face in 1995: Namely, the bar has been raised quite a bit for movies in which teams of superpowered young people have fights to save the universe."

Korey Coleman and Martin Thomas of Double Toasted commented that the cast lacked any relatability and furthermore found the character of Cole Young to be a weak and uninteresting protagonist. James Marsh, of the South China Morning Post, gave a positive review, saying, "Director Simon McQuoid understands and honours the film's video game origins, including memorable lines of dialogue and signature fight moves throughout".

Ben Kenigsberg of The New York Times wrote, "The latest screen adaptation of the video game still shows that trying to construct a coherent plot around these characters is a fatal trap". Brian Lowry of CNN gave Mortal Kombat a negative review, writing: "For those on the fence, though, 'Mortal Kombat' is hardly worth starting, much less finishing". Matt Goldberg of Collider wrote, "Simon McQuoid's new adaptation is a mostly joyless slog that can't even deliver exhilarating fights". Benjamin Lee at The Guardian rated the film 2/5, stating "A silly and dated new attempt to transport the classic fighting game to the big screen is a late-night drunk watch at best".

Sequel
Regarding the continuation of the film as a series, the film's producer Todd Garner revealed to Collider that there is a possibility of a Johnny Cage-centric standalone film. Taslim has revealed that he signed on for four sequels if the reboot is a success. Director Simon McQuoid stated that he is open for returning to direct a sequel if the story for it is good. Co-writer Greg Russo told Collider that he sees the reboot as a trilogy with the first film set before the tournament, the second film set during the tournament and the third film set post-tournament.

In an interview after the film's release, McQuoid said that the character Johnny Cage was not introduced in the film because Johnny Cage was a "giant personality" and would throw the film out of balance. He revealed that potential sequels could explore the material for characters like Cage and Kitana. He also expressed that he would like to include more female characters.

During an interview, Jessica McNamee has expressed interest in exploring her relationship with Johnny and Cassie Cage in potential sequels. Professional wrestler The Miz has openly expressed interest in the role of Johnny Cage and has even received the support of Mortal Kombat co-creator Ed Boon and Mortal Kombat Legends voice actor Joel McHale. Martial artist actor Scott Adkins also showed interest in the role of Cage while interviewing Lewis Tan with the latter agreeing.

On September 14, 2021, Variety reported that Warner Bros. is looking to develop other installments in its Mortal Kombat universe. On January 26, 2022, Warner Bros. had officially greenlit a sequel, with Jeremy Slater set to pen the screenplay. Slater told ComicBook.com that Cage is in the sequel, but is unsure how much he'll be in the movie. In July 2022, McQuoid signed on to direct the sequel.

See also
 List of films based on video games

References

External links
 
 

2021 films
2021 directorial debut films
2021 fantasy films
2021 martial arts films
2020s American films
2020s English-language films
2020s fantasy action films
American films about revenge
American fantasy action films
American martial arts films
Films about parallel universes
Films postponed due to the COVID-19 pandemic
Films produced by James Wan
Films scored by Benjamin Wallfisch
Films set in the 17th century
Films set in Indiana
Films set in Japan
Films set on fictional islands
Films shot in Adelaide
Films shot in South Australia
Films with screenplays by David Callaham
HBO Max films
IMAX films
Japan in non-Japanese culture
Live-action films based on video games
Martial arts fantasy films
Martial arts tournament films
Mortal Kombat films
New Line Cinema films
Ninja films
Prosthetics in fiction
Reboot films
Warner Bros. films
4DX films